Guru Har Sahai is a city and a municipal council in Ferozepur district in the Indian state of Punjab. Nearby cities are Ferozepur (40 km northeast), Sri Muktsar Sahib (30 km south), Fazilka (65 km southwest), Bathinda (84 km southeast).

History

The city is named after the Har Sahai (born 1725 - died 1750 CE), who was the eighth generation direct descendant of the fourth Sikh guru, the Guru Ram Das. The pothimala buiding in 1705 CE and Guru Har Sahai city in 1745 CE were built by Har Sahai's father Guru Jiwan Mal (born 1694 CE), who was a seventh generation direct descendant of fourth sikh guru, Ram Das. Guru Har Sahai was also the eight Gaddi Nashin (custodian) of the pothimala, i.e. pothi (holy book) and mala (rosary), of first guru of Sikhs - the Guru Nanak Dev. The sodhi clan of sikhs consider hereditary appointed direct descendants of fourth sikh guru Ram Das Sodhi as their guru or spiritual leader. In 2010, Archaeological Survey of India (ASI) begin the effort to restore the pothimala and the pothimala buiding and murals, both of which are the property of present gaddi nashin, 17th successor custodian Guru Yuvraj Singh.

Demographics
 India census, Guru Har Sahai had a population of 14,528. Males constitute 53% of the population and females 47%. Guru Har Sahai has an average literacy rate of 61%, higher than the national average of 59.5%: male literacy is 65%, and female literacy is 57%. In Guru Har Sahai, 13% of the population is under 6 years of age.

See also 

 List of cities in Chandigarh and Punjab, India by population

References

Cities and towns in Firozpur district